iceSheffield is an ice arena in the Lower Don Valley, Sheffield, England. iceSheffield was completed in May 2003 at a cost of £15 million and is a Centre of Excellence for figure skating, ice dance and hockey, and it is one of only two facilities in the UK that has two Olympic sized ice pads with seating for 1,500 people in pad 1 and 125 in pad 2. Its overall philosophy of use/focus is for the inclusion and activities for all ice sports from community and grass root usage to elite performance.  It is now home to most ice hockey teams in Sheffield with the exception being the Sheffield Steelers, who are still based at nearby Sheffield Arena, though the venue has hosted a number of Steelers games in recent seasons.

Events

The venue hosts a range of events including many disco sessions for the young people of Sheffield. The main sports team to play at iceSheffield are the Sheffield Bears ice hockey team who play in the BUIHA.

Managed by Sheffield City Trust on behalf of the Sheffield City Trust, in February 2015 it was announced that iceSheffield would be incorporated into the Olympic Legacy Park on the site of the former Don Valley Stadium.

The Sheffield Steelers also use it as a second home and a training ground.

References

External links
Official Site

Sports venues in Sheffield
Indoor ice hockey venues in England
Ice rinks in the United Kingdom